Nancy Wilmot Borlase  (24 March 1914 – 11 September 2006) was a New Zealand-born Australian artist, known for her landscape-based abstract paintings and portraits, and as an art critic and commentator. Her work is displayed in the National Gallery of Australia and other major galleries.

Biography 
Born in Taihape, New Zealand, in 1914, Borlase was 16 when she decided that art was her calling and shifted to Christchurch, where she studied at Canterbury College School of Art under Francis Shurrock.

Borlase moved to Australia in 1937, at age 22, where she studied life drawing and sculpture at East Sydney Technical College under Frank Medworth and Lynden Dadswell (1937–1940)and also life drawing under Rah Fizelle and Grace Crowley before switching to painting. In 1939 she joined the Contemporary Art Society, NSW branch and was an active committee member of the Society between 1952 and 1970.

She lived for a while next to Sidney Nolan in Melbourne, was befriended by his benefactor John Reed, and worked as an artist's model. She married trade union figure Laurie Short in 1941.

Borlase started as a figurative painter before moving to abstract impressionism. Her work was influenced by a study tour to New York in 1956, where she encountered Jackson Pollock, Willem de Kooning and Mark Rothko. Other study tours included tours to the USA 1960; Europe 1956, 1969, 1972, 1973; China 1976 (as one of three art writers).

She worked as an art critic at The Bulletin, Sydney between 1972 and 1973 and the Sydney Morning Herald from 1973.

Notes and references

External links 
 Article: "Too much learning is not enough for artist". "Sydney Morning Herald", Weekend Edition, 17–18 April 2004
 Photo with article: Nancy Borlase
 Nancy Borlase interviewed by Hazel de Berg – sound recording

1914 births
2006 deaths
Members of the Order of Australia
New Zealand emigrants to Australia
Australian women painters
People from Taihape
20th-century Australian painters
20th-century Australian women artists
21st-century Australian women
21st-century Australian people